Thomas Mayer may refer to:

 Thomas Mayer (American economist) (1927–2015)
 Thomas Mayer (German economist) (born 1954)
 Thomas Mayer (motorcyclist), German motorcycle racer
 Thomas Mayer (footballer, born 1995), Austrian footballer
 Thomas Mayer (conductor), in Tasmanian Symphony Orchestra
 Thomas Mayer (skier), see Kevin Bramble
 Thomas Mayer (footballer, born 1927), German footballer in the 1956–57 DFB-Pokal
 Thomas Mayer (footballer, born 1984), German footballer
 Tom W. Mayer, writer and professor of English

See also
 Thomas Maier, author and journalist
 Thomas Maier (footballer) (born 1998), Austrian footballer
 Thomas Mair (disambiguation)